The 2015 Women's EuroHockey Championship III was the 6th edition of the Women's EuroHockey Championship III, a field hockey championship for women. It was held from the 20th until the 25th of August 2015 in Sveti Ivan Zelina, Croatia. The winner of this tournament was promoted to the 2017 Women's EuroHockey Championship II

Qualified teams

Format
The five teams will be placed in a single pool. Each team will play the other four teams once. The final results from those games will also be the final standings.

Results
All times are local (UTC+2).

Standings

Matches

See also
2015 Men's EuroHockey Championship III
2015 Women's EuroHockey Championship II

References

Women's EuroHockey Championship III
EuroHockey Championship III
International women's field hockey competitions hosted by Croatia
EuroHockey Championship III
Women 3